Maryland is divided into eight congressional districts, each represented by a member of the United States House of Representatives. After the 2020 census, the number of Maryland's seats remained unchanged, giving evidence of stable population growth relative to the United States at large.

Current districts and representatives
List of members of the United States House delegation from Maryland, their terms, their district boundaries, and the district political ratings according to the Cook Partisan Voting Index. The delegation has eight members, including seven Democrats and one Republican.

Historical district boundaries
Table of United States congressional district boundary maps in the State of Maryland, presented chronologically. All redistricting events that took place in Maryland between 1973 and 2013 are shown.

List of Maryland's congressional districts
The following are the 8 Maryland's congressional districts:

 Maryland's 1st congressional district
 Maryland's 2nd congressional district
 Maryland's 3rd congressional district
 Maryland's 4th congressional district
 Maryland's 5th congressional district
 Maryland's 6th congressional district
 Maryland's 7th congressional district
 Maryland's 8th congressional district

Obsolete districts

Maryland's at-large congressional seat

See also

List of United States congressional districts
United States congressional delegations from Maryland

References